is a 1962 Japanese jidaigeki film directed by Kinuyo Tanaka. Love Under the Crucifix is the last film Tanaka directed. The film was adapted from Tōkō Kon's novel Ogin-sama.

The film is a bittersweet love story between Sen no Rikyū's daughter Ogin and Takayama Ukon.

Cast
 Ineko Arima as Ogin
 Tatsuya Nakadai as Takayama Ukon
 Mieko Takamine as Riki
 Masakazu Tamura as Ogin's younger brother
 Minoru Chiaki
 Ryūji Kita
 Kuniko Miyake
 Tatsuo Endō
 Yoshi Katō
 Ryosuke Kagawa
 Manami Fuji as Uno
 Yumeji Tsukioka as Lady Yodo
 Kōji Nanbara as Ishida Mitsunari
 Chishū Ryū as Sokei
 Nakamura Ganjirō II as Sen no Rikyū
 Osamu Takizawa as Toyotomi Hideyoshi
 Keiko Kishi as a sinner

References

External links
Under the Crucifix at Shochiku

1962 films
Films directed by Kinuyo Tanaka
Jidaigeki films
Samurai films
1960s Japanese-language films
1960s Japanese films